This is the complete list of all entertainment events held, cancelled and announced to be held in the Stožice Arena.

Entertainment events

Notes

Lists of events in Slovenia
Buildings and structures in Ljubljana
Lists of events by venue